Denmark is an unincorporated community and former city in Madison County, Tennessee, United States roughly 14 miles southwest of Jackson. The zip code is 38391. Although it was once a thriving farming community, a combination of man-made and natural disasters has reduced Denmark to a few remaining houses and the historic antebellum Denmark Presbyterian Church.

History 
Denmark was one of the first-settled places in Madison County. The land on which it was incorporated in 1854 was opened by Thomas Sanders in 1822. Presbyterian and Methodist churches were established in the area in 1833 and 1842. By January 1844, the community had been sufficiently populated that the Tennessee General Assembly incorporated an academy for education of white boys. Prior to the Civil War, Denmark flourished and rivaled neighboring Jackson in size.

During the American Civil War, Union soldiers repulsed a Confederate raid near Denmark in the Battle of Britton's Lane in September 1862. Union troops occupied Tennessee from that year to the end of the war. 

Following the Civil War, Denmark's economy experienced a pronounced decline because the town was bypassed by all of the railroads built through Madison County. Although its population was about 250 in 1886, Denmark's population declined dramatically in the following decades. On 28 April 1983, its municipal charter was revoked by a chancery court order after the Tennessee legislature passed a statute providing for the forfeiting of charters of any city with a population under 100. 

The local high school, chartered in 1885, was merged into South Side High School in Jackson in 1992. The local middle school was disestablished, and its campus was developed for the West Tennessee Regional Training Center. Denmark Elementary is the community's only remaining school.

Destructive weather

Denmark has suffered repeated weather catastrophes that have contributed to the community's decline. A devastating tornado on 14 October 1909, accompanied by a thunderstorm and subsequent fires, inflicted immense damage. Another tornado, in 2003, was as destructive as the one nearly a century before.

Climate
Denmark's climate is characterized by relatively high temperatures and evenly distributed precipitation throughout the year.  According to the Köppen Climate Classification system, Denmark has a Humid subtropical climate, abbreviated "Cfa" on climate maps.

Notable people 
 Walt Bond, Negro league baseball player who later moved to the Major League Baseball Cleveland Indians
 John Murrell, a 19th-century horse and slave thief and noted outlaw of the Natchez Trace who had family who lived in Denmark during his imprisonment

In popular culture 
Two mystery novels take place in part in a fictional version of Denmark: Such Vicious Minds: A Murder Mystery Featuring Elvis Presley by Daniel Klein, and Something Rotten by Alan Gratz.

References

External links 
Big Black Creek Historical Association website
Britton's Lane Battlefield Association
The Life and Adventures of John A. Murrell, the Great Western Land Pirate

1819 establishments in Tennessee
Unincorporated communities in Madison County, Tennessee
Unincorporated communities in Tennessee
Former municipalities in Tennessee